Charmed Life may refer to:

 Charmed Life (novel), a 1977 novel by Diana Wynne Jones
 A Charmed Life, a 1955 novel by Mary McCarthy
 Charmed Life (Billy Idol album), 1990
 Charmed Life (Half Japanese album), 1988
 "Charmed Life", a song by Mick Jagger from The Very Best of Mick Jagger
 "Charmed Life", a song by Leigh Nash